Zopalki is the second album by the Finnish experimental rock band Circle. It was released in 1996 by Bad Vugum.

Track listing

Personnel
J. Ahtiainen
T. Elo
P. Hagner
J-P. Hietaniemi
J. Lehtisalo
M. Päivistö

Circle (band) albums
1996 albums